Sabrosky is a family name. It probably originates from people of the town of Sabrow (Zabierzów). Three towns in Poland hold this name.

Notable people with this family name 
Alan Sabrosky, American security analyst and writer
Curtis Williams Sabrosky (1910–1997), American entomologist

References 

Polish toponymic surnames